Antanimora Prison, also known as Central Prison of Antanimora, officially Maison Centrale Antanimora - Antanarivo, is a prison in Antanimora, Antananarivo, the capital of Madagascar. It holds a maximum of 800 inmates. In 2019, it was reported that more than 4,000 detainees were being held there, many of them still awaiting trial. The prison has been the subject of several documentaries such as Behind Bars: The World’s Toughest Prisons. Its lack of hygiene has been criticized by international organisations.

The prison is separated in blocks and provides one meal per day of only boiled cassava. A US human rights report found that chronic malnutrition is the leading cause of death among prisoners in Madagascar and that the condition affects up to 2/3 of the inmates. A study in 2019 found that 38% of female prisoners at Antanimora Prison are undernourished due to the lack of healthy food, low calorie intake, and lack of financial assistance.

References

Prisons in Madagascar
Antananarivo